The John Lippincott House  is a historic building located in the West End of Davenport, Iowa, United States. It has been listed on the National Register of Historic Places since 1983.

History
John Lippincott built this after the conclusion of the American Civil War. He did not list an occupation for himself instead he said he was a capitalist.

Architecture
The house is an example of a popular form found in the city of Davenport: two-story, three–bay front gable, with an entrance off center and a small attic window below the roof peak. This house has the suggestion of a classical pediment, which is accomplished by bringing the roof eaves and cornice partway across the front.  A small columned porch with a pediment completes the front. Another architectural element to the house is a bay window that is featured toward the back on the east side of the house.

References

Houses completed in 1870
Greek Revival houses in Iowa
Houses in Davenport, Iowa
Houses on the National Register of Historic Places in Iowa
National Register of Historic Places in Davenport, Iowa